More & More is the ninth extended play by South Korean girl group Twice. It was released by JYP Entertainment and Republic Records on June 1, 2020, Marketed as the group's ninth "mini album" release, it consists of seven tracks, including the lead single of the same name. It is their first release with Republic Records.

Consisting of seven tracks that features various genres including Latin pop, new jack swing, bass music, and tropical house, the EP received generally favorable reviews from music critics which praised Twice's musical growth as they adapted a more mature style. More & More sold more than 563,000 copies on the Gaon Album Chart, becoming Twice's best-selling album until it was surpassed by Formula of Love: O+T=<3 in 2021. It is their first entry on the US Billboard 200, charting at number 200.

Background and release 
It was first reported by media outlets on April 20, 2020, that Twice were in the final stages of preparation for an upcoming album as well as music video filming. JYP Entertainment confirmed the reports later that day. On April 28, Twice held an online press conference for their YouTube original series Twice: Seize the Light, with member Jihyo confirming that their comeback was set on June 1. The members then revealed the title of their upcoming single to be "More & More".  It is the group's first comeback as a nine-piece group after member Mina took a break from activities due to mental health issues.

In May, it was confirmed that the group's upcoming EP would have the same name as its title track, with J. Y. Park and a team of international songwriters and producers including MNEK of Britain, Zara Larsson of Sweden, and American singer-songwriter Julia Michaels having joined the album's production. On May 7, the group announced the contents of the three physical album versions, with pre-orders beginning May 11. On May 18, the tracklist for the EP was revealed through JYP Entertainment's Twitter account.

The album alongside the music video for its eponymous title track was released on June 1 at 6PM KST. This marked the group's first release with Republic Records after last signing with the American label earlier in February.

Composition 
More & More consists of seven tracks that features various genres from Latin pop, new jack swing, bass music, and tropical pop, among others. The album's title track of the same name is a tropical house song featuring an EDM-heavy instrumental chorus which lyrically depicts a theme of desire. "Oxygen" describes the growth of a romance which develops from an innocent affection to a fiery love. "Firework" features a Latin-inspired rhythm that opens with a guitar line, with the members lyrically comparing themselves to exploding pyrotechnics as they describe the sensation of a romantic relationship. "Make Me Go" is a song written by Nayeon that discusses the feeling of passion. "Shadow" conveys underlying pain that one feels and hides in the middle of an active relationship. "Don't Call Me Again" is a straightforward portrayal of a romantic breakup. The closing track written by Jeongyeon and Chaeyoung, "Sweet Summer Day", does not explicitly reference love with its lyrics encouraging one to leave behind the worries of yesterday.

Talking about their album, member Jeongyeon stated that the group wanted to create a track that was different from what they had done before.

Promotion 
In support of their album, Twice performed its lead single on various South Korean music programs starting with Mnet's M! Countdown on June 4, 2020. This was followed by performances on KBS's Music Bank and SBS's Inkigayo.In their second week of promotion, Twice received their first music show trophy for "More & More" on MBC Music's Show Champion. The group appeared as guests on June 7 episode of the variety show Running Man. Following their music show win on June 12 on Music Bank with "More & More", the group had accumulated a total of 100 music show wins throughout their career.

On August 9, Twice embarked on their first online concert titled "Beyond LIVE: World In A Day", with the group performing 15 songs including three tracks from their latest EP release: "More & More", "Shadow", and "Firework". Expanding their reach globally, Twice released an English-language version of "More & More" on August 21.

Critical reception 
Kim Do-heon of IZM gave a generally favorable review to the album, stating that Twice is "one step closer to building a stable album with More & More," citing the pool of international producers and songwriters as well as the variety of music genres included in the material as a strength which "presents the possibility of [further] collaborations". Writer Kat Moon from Time magazine describes that the album "might have been disjointed, yet More & More is one of Twice's most cohesive albums, in large part because its seven songs build on a progressing storyline." She also praised the group for managing to adapt a more mature concept without giving up their trademark bright demeanor, and states that "Twice is a versatile ensemble keen on surprising their audience." Amanda Lee of Sound Digest states that all seven songs from the album will "have you ready to make some sweet summer memories", while also noting the continuing maturity of Twice's musical direction.

Commercial performance 
On May 27, it was reported that the pre-order sales of More & More had surpassed 500,000, becoming a half-million seller before release and their best-selling release. With over 260,000 copies sold on Hanteo on the first day, Twice broke the record at its time for the highest first-day sales for a Korean girl group. They also became the first Korean girl group to surpass 200,000 albums sold on the first day of release. On July 2, Gaon confirmed that More & More reached 563,000 copies sold in shipments, making it not only Twice's best-selling album to date, but also setting a record for the highest album sales volume by a girl group in Gaon Chart history. With this, the group had reached an accumulated total of 5.26 million albums sold throughout their career.

More & More debuted at number 1 on the Gaon Album Chart, while all of its tracks charted on the component Download Chart, with the title track topping it. The EP also debuted atop the Oricon Albums Chart and at number 3 on Billboard Japan'''s Hot Albums chart. It also debuted at number 25 on the UK Album Downloads Chart, making it their highest entry and second overall. The EP also entered at number 200 on the Billboard 200'', making Twice the fourth South Korean girl group to break into the chart, after Girls' Generation, 2NE1 and Blackpink (fifth including the Girls' Generation sub-unit TTS). It also charted at number 3 on the US Heatseekers Albums and at number 2 on the World Albums charts, respectively, making it their eleventh top 10 entry on the latter.

Track listing
Adapted from the group's official website.

Personnel
Credits adapted from album liner notes.

J.Y. Park "The Asiansoul" – producer, vocal director (on "More & More")
Kim Yeo-joo (Jane Kim) – music (A&R)
Choi Eun-su – music admin (A&R)
Kim Ji-hyung – production (A&R)
Kim Yu-ju – production (A&R)
Kang Gun – production (A&R)
Hwang Hyun-jun – production (A&R)
Kim Tae-eun – design (A&R), album art director & designer
Seo Yeon-ah – design (A&R), album art director & designer, web designer
Lee So-yeon – design (A&R), album art director & designer, web designer
Hwang Si-nae – admin (A&R)
Choi Hye-jin – recording engineer, digital editor
Eom Se-hee – recording engineer, digital editor
Lee Sang-yeop – recording engineer, digital editor
Park Eun-jung – recording engineer
Goo Hye-jin – assistant recording engineer
Lee Tae-seob – mixing engineer
Lim Hong-jin – mixing engineer
Kwon Nam-woo – mastering engineer
NAIVE Production – video director
Kim Yeong-jo – video executive producer
Yoo Seung-woo – video executive producer
Kim Eui-mil – photographer
Park Gyu-tae – assistant photographer
Kim Hyun-tae – assistant photographer
Park Hyun-kyung – assistant photographer
Jung Nan-young at LULU – hair director
Son Eun-hee at LULU – hair director
Choi Ji-young at LULU – hair director
Lim Jin-hee at LULU – hair director
Heo Yeon-ji at LULU – hair director
Park Min-jung at LULU – hair director
Jo Sang-ki at LULU – makeup director
Zia at LULU – makeup director
Jeon Dal-rae at LULU – makeup director
Won Jung-yo at BIT&BOOT – makeup director
Choi Gyeong-won at F9ISSUE – style director
Shin Hyun-kuk – management & marketing director
Kiel Tutin – choreographer
Leejung Lee – choreographer
Twice – lead vocals
Lee Hae-sol – vocal director (on "More & More", "Sweet Summer Day")
Sophia Pae – background vocals (on "More & More", "Firework", "Shadow"), vocal director (on "Firework", "Shadow")
Brayton Bowman – background vocals (on "More & More")
Zara Larsson – background vocals (on "More & More")
Johan Gustafsson – all instruments, additional background vocals (on "Oxygen")
Josefin Glenmark – additional background vocals (on "Oxygen")
Kim Yeon-seo – background vocals (on "Oxygen", "Make Me Go", "Don't Call Me Again", "Sweet Summer Day"), vocal director (on "Oxygen", "Make Me Go", "Don't Call Me Again")
minGtion – digital editor (on "Firework")
Slyberry – bass, guitar (on "Firework")
Choi Jae-yeol – drum (on "Firework")
Kim Jin-hyung – keyboard (on "Firework")
Ryan Ashley – vocal arranger (on "Make Me Go")
Jeong Yoo-ra – digital editor (on "Make Me Go", "Shadow", "Don't Call Me Again", "Sweet Summer Day")
Greg Bonnick – keyboard, drums, programming (on "Shadow")
Hayden Chapman – keyboard, drums, programming (on "Shadow")
Email – all instruments (on "Don't Call Me Again")
Gabe Lopez – all instruments (on "Sweet Summer Day")

Charts

Weekly charts

Year-end charts

Certifications

See also
 List of Gaon Album Chart number ones of 2020

References

2020 EPs
Korean-language EPs
Twice (group) EPs
Republic Records EPs
JYP Entertainment EPs